Rodrigo Santana is the name of:

Rodrigo Marques de Santana, a Brazilian football manager
Rodrigão, a Brazilian volleyball player